This page covers all relevant details regarding PFC Cherno More Varna for all official competitions inside the 2013–14 season. These are A PFG and Bulgarian Cup.

Transfers

In

Out

Loans in

Squad information

Competitions

Overall

Competition Record

Start formations
Accounts for all competitions. Numbers constitute according game of the competition in which the formation was used, NOT number of occurrences.

Goalscorers

Captains

Penalties

Suspensions served

Club

Coaching staff
{|class="wikitable"
!Position
!Staff
|-
|-
|Manager|| Georgi Ivanov
|-
|Assistant First Team Coach|| Ivaylo Petrov
|-
|Assistant First Team Coach|| Emanuil Lukanov
|-
|Goalkeeper Coach|| Stoyan Stavrev
|-
|First Team Fitness Coach|| Veselin Markov
|-
|Individual Team Fitness Coach|| Viktor Bumbalov
|-
|Medical Director|| Dr. Petko Atev
|-
|Academy Manager|| Hristina Dimitrova
|-

Other information

References

PFC Cherno More Varna seasons
Cherno More Varna